Morton S. Wilkinson (1819–1894) was a U.S. Senator from Minnesota from 1859 to 1865, also serving in the Minnesota State Senate. Senator Wilkinson may also refer to:

A. H. Wilkinson (1875–1954), Wisconsin State Senate
Smith S. Wilkinson (1824–1889), Wisconsin State Senate

See also
Dianne Wilkerson (born 1955), Massachusetts State Senate
Samuel Wilkeson (1781–1848), New York State Senate